Shtime or Štimlje, is a town and municipality located in the Ferizaj District of Kosovo. According to the 2011 census, the town of Shtime has 7,225 inhabitants, while the municipality has 27,324 inhabitants. The territory of the municipality covers an area of 134 square kilometers.

History
Since the end of the 13th century Shtime was one of four courts of the King of Serbia in Nerodimlje župa. Its position at that time was on the northern bank of Svrčin Lake.

Demographics

Notes and references 

Notes:

References:

External links 

 Municipality of Štimlje
 OSCE Profile of Štimlje
 SOK Kosovo and its population

Municipalities of Kosovo
Cities in Kosovo